Zohaib Kazi is a Pakistani musician, composer, lyricist, and record producer. Kazi started his media career at Hum Network Limited before serving as an associate producer at Coke Studio Pakistan from 2009 to 2017. In 2012, Kazi released a digital album Butterfly in Space, but received a widespread acclaim and recognition with his 2016 conceptual album Ismail Ka Urdu Sheher which was also released as a graphic novel. The album gained a world-wide recognition, and was nominated for Best Music Album at 15th Lux Style Awards.

In 2017, Kazi partnered with Patari to produce his second album Fanoos, containing songs from regional artists across Pakistan. Fanoos was met with a positive response and earned him another Best Music Album nomination at the 17th Lux Style Awards. One song from the album, "Takht Hazar", was nominated for Best Song of the Year, with Kazi accredited as a producer. In 2018, Kazi was announced as a lead producer for the eleventh series of Coke Studio with musician Ali Hamza.

Discography

Albums
 Butterfly in Space (2012)
 Ismail Ka Urdu Sheher (2015)
 Fanoos (2017)

Singles
 "Bijuri" ft. Devika Chawla (2011)
 "Naraaz Mausam" ft. Devika Chawla (2012)
 "Alvida" ft. Zoe Viccaji (2013)
 "Bolo" ft. Zoe Viccaji (2013)

Other works
 Lounge Nirvana (2012)  
 Coke Studio Explorer (2018)  
 Coke Studio Pakistan (season 11) (2018)

Awards and nominations

References

External links
 Zohaib Kazi at Coke Studio
  
 

Living people
People from Karachi
People from Sindh
Pakistani musicians
Pakistani record producers
Pakistani music people
Pakistani music video directors
Pakistani composers
Pakistani songwriters
Pakistani guitarists
Hum TV people
21st-century guitarists
1984 births